The Boulevard Line is a  long partly underground railway between Copenhagen Central Station and Østerport Station in Copenhagen, Denmark. The quadruple track railway carries today one dual track for the Copenhagen S-train system and another dual track for the mainline railway and regional trains. The line has two intermediate stations, Vesterport Station and Nørreport Station. It continues above ground to Nordhavn station and at Svanemøllen station the tracks separate towards either Ryparken station or Hellerup station. Dybbølsbro station is also located along this railway, located just a bit south of Copenhagen Central. Out of the four main S-train branches, three follow this path, between Dybbølsbro and Svanemøllen (with at least four tracks). Only at Copenhagen Central, Nørreport and Østerport do all trains stop. While Dybbølsbro, Vesterport, Nordhavn and Svanemøllen all are S-train stations only. (Nørreport also has Metro service, just as both the Central Station, Østerport and Nordhavn have since 2019).

History 

It opened in 1917, allowing services on the Coast Line and the Klampenborg Line to extend to Copenhagen Central Station. The line became part of the S-train network on 15 May 1934.

References
Bibliography
 

Notes

External links

S-train (Copenhagen) lines
Railway lines in Denmark
Rail transport in Copenhagen
Railway lines opened in 1917
Railway tunnels in Denmark
Underground commuter rail